The World Trade Center Chittagong (also called World Trade Center or WTC Chittagong), is a , 21-floor complex located in Agrabad Commercial Area, Chittagong, Bangladesh. The building was opened in 2016.

This is the first World Trade Center in Bangladesh. Concord Group constructed this project.  Concord Group introduced and implemented Top Down construction technology in this building.

Complex
The Chittagong World Trade Center has the following facilities:

 5-star hotel
 International standard convention hall
 Conference center
 Exhibition hall
 World Trade Centre Club
 3 basement car parking for 400 cars
 Media center
 Office block
 Block for financial institutions 
 IT Zone
 Headquarters for the Chittagong Chamber of Commerce & Industry

Gallery

References

Further reading

External links

 World Trade Center Chittagong at Chittagong Chamber of Commerce & Industry

Buildings and structures in Agrabad
Skyscraper office buildings in Bangladesh
Economy of Chittagong
Chittagong
Buildings and structures completed in 2016